Bhaiyaa is Magahi language film released in 1961  directed by Phani Majumdar.

Cast 
 Tarun Bose as  Parmanand
 Vijaya Choudhury as  Bindu
 Gopal as  Murli
 Helen as  Dancer / Singer at Murli's son's birthday
 Padma Khanna as  Chandra Hariram Prasad (as Kumari Padma)
 Shubha Khote as  Pretty village girl
 Achala Sachdev as  Maya
 Bhagwan Sinha
 Lata Sinha as  Kamla
 Ramayan Tiwari as  Gulati

Synopsis
Parmanand lives a poor lifestyle in a village along with his widowed stepmother, Maya, and her two children, a son, Murli, who is studying in a Bombay college, and daughter, Kamla. Parmanand is in love with beautiful Bindu and hopes to marry her someday. When Murli returns home after obtaining a degree in arts, Parmanand notices that he loves Bindu, so he steps aside and permits him to marry her much to Maya's displeasure. Shortly after the marriage, Parmanand finds out that Murli has been spending a lot of time with Chandra, the daughter of Hariram Prasad. When he counsels Murli, he gets abused, and beats Murli up.  Upset at this treatment, Murli and Bindu move out. Shortly thereafter Bindu gets pregnant much to Chandra's displeasure. Chandra confronts Bindu in a bid to make her hate her child and force her to abort while Murli files a claim in Court contesting his late father's Will as a forgery. Watch what impact this has on the rest of the family.

See also 
 Cinema of Bihar

References

External links

Magahi-language films
1965 films
Films directed by Phani Majumdar
Films with screenplays by Phani Majumdar